Sholto Carnegie (born 28 February 1995) is a British rower. He won a gold medal in the coxless four at the 2019 European Rowing Championships with Oliver Cook, Matthew Rossiter and Rory Gibbs. The same crew then won a bronze medal at the 2019 World Rowing Championships.

In 2021, he won a second European gold medal when winning the coxless four in Varese, Italy.

References

External links

1995 births
Living people
British male rowers
World Rowing Championships medalists for Great Britain
Rowers at the 2020 Summer Olympics
Olympic rowers of Great Britain
Yale Bulldogs rowers
Rowers from Greater London
21st-century British people